Adams Golf, Inc. is an American sports equipment manufacturing company based in Plano, Texas, focused on the golf equipment market. The company produced golf equipment (more specifically clubs). In 2012 it was acquired by TaylorMade (owned by Adidas), becoming one of its brands.

History 
In 1983, Barney Adams joined Dave Pelz Golf in Abilene, Texas. When Pelz's Preceptor Golf went bankrupt in 1988, Adams bought the assets and started Adams Golf. He moved the company to Dallas in 1991.

Adams Golf initially specialized in custom fitted golf clubs, initially becoming associated with Hank Haney setting up a club fitting and repair shop at the Hank Haney Golf Ranch.

Adams "Tight Lies" fairway wood became a commercial success as the result of television infomercial, with sportscaster Jack Whittaker as the host and narrator; Haney, then Tiger Woods' coach; Bill Rogers, British Open winner and PGA Player of the Year in 1981; and LPGA Hall of Famer Carol Mann, as spokespersons.

In 1998, Adams Golf went public on Wall Street, with an initial public offering underwritten by Lehman Brothers.  Barney Adams was selected as Manufacturing Entrepreneur of the Year by Ernst & Young in 1999. Although semi-retired since 2000, Barney Adams retains the title Chairman of the Board until 2012.

In 2012, Adams Golf was acquired by TaylorMade Golf (which was owned by Adidas by then) for USD 10.80 per share in cash (roughly 70 million). As a result, Adams was added to the corporation set of golf brands, such as Adidas Golf and TaylorMade–adidas Golf. TaylorMade assured that Adams' headquarters in Plano, Texas, would remain. Nevertheless, by 2016 the Adams brand had lost market position, with some media considering it "an afterthought" at TaylorMade.

In 2020, after a 5-year hiatus from releasing new models, Adams released their Tight Lies series, a one-off line of fairway woods and hybrids. As of 2023, they have not released any further equipment.

Sponsorships
Adams Golf has maintained endorsement deals with many professional golfers playing on the leading tours, including Bernhard Langer, Brittany Lincicome, Yani Tseng and Tom Watson.

References

External links
 Adams Golf company (archived, 3 Feb 2011)
 Adams Golf (TaylorMade brand) (archived, 5 Jul 2017)

Golf equipment manufacturers
Manufacturing companies based in Texas
Companies based in Plano, Texas
Sporting goods manufacturers of the United States
Companies formerly listed on the Nasdaq
Manufacturing companies established in 1991
1998 initial public offerings
2012 mergers and acquisitions
1991 establishments in Texas
2012 disestablishments in Texas
Manufacturing companies disestablished in 2012